Robert Wisdom Cudjoe is a Ghanaian politician who served as a member of parliament for the Prestea-Huni Valley Constituency.

Early life and education
Cudjoe was born on 6 June 1965. He hails from Aboso Nsuaem in the Western Region of Ghana.He also served as district chief executive (DCE) during 2008 to 2016.

References

1965 births
Living people
National Democratic Congress (Ghana) politicians
Ghanaian MPs 2021–2025
People from Western Region (Ghana)